Ede Centrum is a railway station located in Ede, Netherlands. The station was opened on 1 May 1902 and is located on the Nijkerk–Ede-Wageningen railway. The station closed on 7 September 1944 and re-opened 20 May 1951. Connexxion took over the train services on this line from Nederlandse Spoorwegen on 10 December 2006, under the brand Valleilijn.

Train services
, the following local train services call at this station:

Stoptrein: Amersfoort - Barneveld - Ede-Wageningen

References

External links
Dutch Public Transport journey planner 

Rijksmonuments in Ede, Netherlands
Railway stations in Ede, Netherlands
Railway stations opened in 1902
Railway stations on the Valleilijn
1902 establishments in the Netherlands
Railway stations in the Netherlands opened in the 20th century